Bell End is a village in the English county of Worcestershire. It lies in the local government District of Bromsgrove.

On the western side of the village is Bell Hall, a Victorian Gothic mansion on the site of the original manor house. It was built in 1847 for Charles Noel, later a High Sheriff of Worcestershire, by the architect Edward Smith of Oldswinford. In 2010 the property was offered for sale at £3.5m.

The village shares its name with the British slang for the glans penis.

References

Villages in Worcestershire